Luis Oscar Fulloné Arce, better known as Oscar Fulloné (4 April 1939 – 22 May 2017) was an Argentine football coach and player. He played as a midfielder for Independiente Medellín and Real Oviedo before moving to England to play for Aston Villa in 1967.  Known as Oscar Arce during his time in England he remained in the country following his retirement from playing and was a coach for both Sheffield United and Sunderland. He became manager of Swiss side FC Sion in 1980 before going on to become one of the most successful African club managers.

Playing career
Fulloné started his career with Estudiantes in Argentina, Independiente Medellín in Colombia and Real Oviedo in Spain.

In 1968, he joined Aston Villa of England alongside his younger brother, Hector Fulloné Arce. It was reported at the time that "Oscar Arce is a wizard of ball control who was so determined to play for Aston Willa that he completed a two-year residential qualification in this country". Together they played in The Central League for the reserve team during the 1968–69 season. Neither brother played for the first team. In October 1969, Fulloné underwent successful surgery to have cartilage removed from his left leg. Fulloné was released from his contract and Hector returned to Argentina.

Coaching and managerial career
After retiring as a player, Fulloné became a football coach. He was appointed as youth team manager at Millwall in September 1977, reportedly turning down the opportunity to manage El Salvador at the 1977 CONCACAF Championship. He was on the staff at Sheffield United between 1978 and 1979 when the club tried to sign Argentine international Diego Maradona but ultimately ended up signing Alejandro Sabella instead. Fulloné was also involved in the transfer of Argentine World Cup winners Ricardo Villa and Osvaldo Ardiles to Spurs.

Fulloné's managerial career began in Switzerland where he served as manager of Swiss side FC Sion between 1980 and 1981. Since then he spent most of his career managing African teams, winning league titles in Ivory Coast, Libya, Morocco and Tunisia. He won the African Champions League twice in consecutive years with different clubs in ASEC and Raja Casablanca. He would go on to win the African Cup Winners' Cup with Wydad Casablanca in 2002. He was nominated by CAF for Africa-based coach of the year but lost out to Bruno Metsu.

Fulloné also had a brief spell as manager of the Burkina Faso national team between September 2001 and January 2002 but left the position ahead of the 2002 African Cup of Nations due to the illness of his wife who was hospitalised in Paris, France.

Death
He died in May 2017, at the age of 78, in Morocco.

References

External links
Profile at afrik.com 

1939 births
2017 deaths

Argentine footballers
Categoría Primera A players
Independiente Medellín footballers
Real Oviedo players
Association football midfielders

Argentine expatriate footballers
Expatriate footballers in Spain
Expatriate footballers in England
Expatriate footballers in Colombia
Argentine expatriate sportspeople in Spain
Argentine expatriate sportspeople in England
Argentine expatriate sportspeople in Colombia

Argentine football managers
Sheffield United F.C. non-playing staff

FC Sion managers
Raja CA managers
Al Ain FC managers
Al Masry SC managers
Burkina Faso national football team managers
Wydad AC managers
Espérance Sportive de Tunis managers
Mamelodi Sundowns F.C. managers
Maghreb de Fès managers
USM Alger managers
KAC Kénitra managers

Argentine expatriate football managers
Expatriate football managers in Switzerland
Argentine expatriate sportspeople in Switzerland
Expatriate football managers in Ivory Coast

Expatriate football managers in Morocco
Argentine expatriate sportspeople in Morocco
Expatriate football managers in Libya
Argentine expatriate sportspeople in Libya
Expatriate football managers in Egypt
Argentine expatriate sportspeople in Egypt
Expatriate football managers in Tunisia
Argentine expatriate sportspeople in Tunisia
Expatriate soccer managers in South Africa
Argentine expatriate sportspeople in South Africa

Expatriate football managers in Algeria
Argentine expatriate sportspeople in Algeria

Botola managers
Tunisian Ligue Professionnelle 1 managers
Algerian Ligue Professionnelle 1 managers
Egyptian Premier League managers
Footballers from La Plata
Millwall F.C. non-playing staff
Sunderland A.F.C. non-playing staff
Association football coaches